?= may refer to:

 A modifier symbol in regular expressions
 Symbol indicating end of encoding in a MIME encoded-word

See also 
 =? (disambiguation)